Mesuji  Regency is a regency (kabupaten) of Lampung Province, on Sumatra island, Indonesia. It has an area of 2,184 km2 and a population of 187,286 people at the 2010 census and 227,518 at the 2020 census; the pofficial estimate as at mid 2021 was 229,772. The regency seat is the town of Mesuji.

Administrative divisions
Administratively the regency is divided into seven districts (kecamatan), tabulated below with their areas and their populations at the 2010 census and 2020 census, together with the official estiomates as at mid 2021.

History
In November 2010, four people were killed in a cock fight bust-up in the village of Wirabinangun.

References

Regencies of Lampung